Cyclone Freddy is the longest-lived tropical cyclone on record, beating the previous record of Hurricane John in 1994. It also has the highest accumulated cyclone energy (ACE) of any tropical cyclone on record worldwide, surpassing Hurricane Ioke in 2006. Additionally, Freddy is the only known tropical cyclone to achieve seven separate rapid intensification cycles. While in the Australian region cyclone basin, the storm quickly intensified and became a Category 4 severe tropical cyclone, before it moved into the South-West Indian Ocean basin. The Joint Typhoon Warning Center (JTWC) estimated Freddy's peak strength, equivalent to Category 5 strength on the Saffir–Simpson scale. On 19 February, Météo-France (MFR) upgraded it to a very intense tropical cyclone. Freddy made its first landfall near Mananjary, Madagascar.  

Freddy rapidly weakened overland but re-strengthened in the Mozambique Channel. Soon afterward, Freddy made its second landfall just south of Vilankulos, Mozambique. On 2 March, the remnant low of Freddy began to acquire tropical characteristics after re-emerging into the channel. Soon after, Freddy intensified, becoming a tropical cyclone. Then, Freddy made its third landfall in Quelimane, Zambezia Province, Mozambique, Freddy gradually deteriorated and dissipated on 15 March.

Origins

During 30 January, the Australian Bureau of Meteorology (BoM) began monitoring a developing weak tropical low embedded within a monsoon trough in the Timor Sea. The disturbance was assigned the official identifier code 13U. Environmental conditions were assessed as being marginally conducive for tropical cyclogenesis. During 6 February, the Joint Typhoon Warning Center (JTWC) issued a Tropical Cyclone Formation Alert (TCFA) on the system. By 09:00 UTC, the JTWC initiated advisories on the system and classified it as Tropical Cyclone 11S. The BoM reported that the tropical low had developed into a Category 1 tropical cyclone on the Australian tropical cyclone intensity scale and named it Freddy. 

Later that next day, feeder bands were covering its very broad and central dense overcast (CDO), prompting the JTWC to upgrade the system to a Category 1-equivalent cyclone. The BoM subsequently followed suit and upgraded Freddy into a Category 2 tropical cyclone. Freddy attained Category 3 cyclone. Freddy began showing an eye feature seen in microwave imaging, with Freddy later becoming a Category 2-equivalent cyclone. Freddy weakened slightly due to CDO and a persistent area of cold cloud tops.

Crossover, rapid deepening, and first landfall
Continuing to rapidly intensify, Freddy became a Category 3-equivalent cyclone around 15:00 UTC on 11 February. Freddy had further intensified to a Category 4 severe tropical cyclone due to the presence of a well-defined eye surrounded by deep convection. Freddy intensified into a Category 4-equivalent cyclone with a symmetric CDO. According to the JTWC, Freddy gradually became disorganized, with its eye no longer well-defined, and Freddy fell to  winds. Despite easterly vertical wind shear, Freddy maintained a symmetric convective core. The cyclone's ragged and cloud filled eye appeared on satellite imagery. At 12:00 UTC on 14 February, Freddy crossed 90° E into the South-West Indian Ocean basin, and was immediately classified as a tropical cyclone by Météo-France (MFR) The MFR upgraded the system to an intense tropical cyclone. 

Freddy exhibited highly symmetrical and annular characteristics around 03:00 UTC on 15 February. During 18 February, Freddy began to rapidly deteriorate as a sudden spike in mid-level shear began impacting the storm. As a result, the cyclone briefly weakened to 1-minute sustained winds of  before restrengthening once again. Later that next day, Freddy was upgraded to a very intense tropical cyclone. Shortly afterward, Freddy's cloud pattern slightly deteriorated, causing the cyclone to weaken to an intense tropical cyclone by 00:00 UTC on 20 February. Freddy passed north of Mauritius and Réunion and weakened to a tropical cyclone on 21 February. At about 7 p.m. local time that day, the cyclone made its first landfall near Mananjary, Madagascar.

Re-strengthening, second landfall, and weakening 

During 22 February, Freddy significantly improved in organization as it moved southwestward across the Mozambique Channel. Later that day, Freddy re-strengthened into a zone of disturbed weather. Freddy had re-developed under the deep convection in the northern semicircle of the circulation. Freddy re-strengthened into a moderate tropical storm after the convection began to rapidly increase. The system passed to the north of Europa Island. Freddy re-strengthened further, marking its intensification into a severe tropical storm. Freddy continued to organize with convective bands wrapping into the center.

Six hours later, the cloud pattern deteriorated, as it approached the coast of Mozambique. Shortly after the landfall, the JTWC discontinued warnings about the system. Freddy rapidly weakened as it moved westward and further inland, weakening to an overland depression by 18:00 UTC that day. The MFR determined that Freddy's convective activity was located in the southeast semicircle. Although the MFR stopped issuing advisories  on 25 February, they were still monitoring and predicted that the remnant low would likely re-develop into a tropical system.

Re-development and third landfall 

During 1 March, Freddy re-emerged into the Mozambique Channel, the JTWC resumed monitoring and stated the system had the potential to re-develop. Environmental conditions were assessed as being marginally conducive for tropical cyclogenesis, with low vertical wind shear and moderate equatorial outflow. During 2 March, Freddy observed an increase in deep convection in the eastern semicircle, prompting the MFR to classify the storm as a tropical disturbance again. Microwave imagery revealed that Freddy convection was gradually wrapping around the southern periphery of the circulation.  Later that next day, Freddy was downgraded to zone of disturbed weather status by the MFR.  Multispectral animated satellite imagery partially revealed an exposed low-level circulation center (LLCC) with deep convection persisting along the eastern periphery of the LLCC. As a result, the JTWC re-issued a TCFA by 21:00 UTC that day. Freddy showed signs of intensification as it approached the system's estimated center, the MFR upgraded the system to a tropical depression. Freddy strengthened into a moderate tropical storm as the ASCAT-C pass featured below gale-force winds on its southern quadrant.  
Six hours later, Freddy gained tropical storm strength yet again under the influence of a persistent area of convection. The convection continued to decrease, and Freddy was better organized through the LLCC. Freddy gradually improved its convection with improvements in further consolidation. By 18:00 UTC on 5 March, Freddy strengthened into a severe tropical storm as it accelerated eastward toward the coast of Madagascar. The convection wrapped around the system's LLCC and the system gradually consolidated.  Freddy began to show an ill-defined eye that was visible on satellite imagery.  

Six hours later, Freddy continued to interact with a mid-troposphere shear. Freddy fell to severe tropical storm status later that next day. The cyclone then rapidly weakened as a result of the presence of higher wind shear as well as dry air intrusion. Despite the shear, convection intensified near the center as banding features improved. The cyclone had a well-defined eye within the storm's compact and symmetrical CDO. The JTWC subsequently issued a final warning on the system three hours later. As the cyclone's eye disappeared from satellite imagery, Freddy weakened into a severe tropical storm. Six hours later, Freddy's cloud pattern deteriorated, with the storm weakening back into a moderate tropical storm. At 12:00 UTC on 13 March, the MFR issued its last advisory on the storm. Later on 15 March, Freddy's remnants dissipated over Mozambique.

Records and statistics 

Cyclone Freddy holds the record for the longest-lasting tropical cyclone worldwide in recorded history. Freddy also holds the record for the all-time highest accumulated cyclone energy of a tropical cyclone worldwide, with an ACE of 87.01, breaking the former record of 85.26, set by Hurricane Ioke in 2006. Additionally, Freddy was the first tropical cyclone to undergo seven separate rounds of rapid intensification. 

Before Freddy, no storms in the southern hemisphere had rapidly intensified more than three times. In the northern hemisphere, only three storms appear to have experienced four bouts of rapid intensification, including Hurricane Norman in 2018, Hurricane Emily in 2005, and Hurricane John in 1994. The World Meteorological Organization (WMO) estimates that Freddy has produced roughly as much ACE as an average whole Atlantic hurricane season. The WMO will conduct a formal investigation to determine whether Freddy tied or surpassed John's record. Freddy was one of only four systems—the others being cyclones Litanne in 1994 and Leon–Eline and Hudah in  2000—to travel the entirety of the southern Indian Ocean.

See also

List of South-West Indian Ocean very intense tropical cyclones
List of Category 4 Australian region severe tropical cyclones
Tropical cyclones in the Mascarene Islands
Hurricane John (1994) – The second longest-lasting and the farthest-traveling tropical cyclone ever observed
Cyclones Katrina and Victor–Cindy (1998) – An extremely long-lived tropical cyclone in the South Pacific that eventually regenerated into another cyclone in the Indian Ocean
Hurricane Dora (1999) – One of few tropical cyclones to track across all three north Pacific basins
Hurricane Ioke (2006) – The second highest accumulated cyclone energy (ACE) recorded in history

Notes

References

External links

MFR Track Data of Very Intense Tropical Cyclone Freddy 
JTWC Operational Track Data of Tropical Cyclone 11S (Freddy)
11S.FREDDY from the United States Naval Research Laboratory

Cyclone Freddy
2022–23 Australian region cyclone season
2022–23 South-West Indian Ocean cyclone season
Freddy
F